Heinzenberg Castle  is a ruined castle in the municipality of Cazis in the Viamala Region of the canton of Graubünden in Switzerland.

History
Heinzenberg Castle was built on the western side of the Domleschg Valley in the 12th century by the Freiherr von Vaz.  In contrast to the small landholdings of other castles in the region, Heinzenberg was the political and judicial center over much of the valley.  Though the first mention of the castle was in 1394, by 1380 the name was applied to the river and the entire side of the valley.  The castle was the center of the Vaz family's power in the region until the extinction of the line in 1337–38.

After the extinction of the Vaz, the castle passed to Count Rudolph IV von Werdenberg-Sargans.  His son Johann sold it in 1383 to Ulrich Bran von Rhäzüns.  In 1450 there was a dispute over inheritance in the Rhäzüns family, the imperial court at Rottweil assigned Heinzenberg to Ursula von Hohenberg, a member of the Rhäzüns family.  The castle was damaged in 1451–52 during fighting in the nearby Schams part of the valley.  In 1461 the castle returned to the Werdenberg-Sargans family.  In 1475 the Heinzenberg lands, except for the castle, was sold to the Bishop of Chur.  In 1482 there was a Werdenberg vogt resident in the castle.  After the death of Count Georg von Werdenberg-Sargans in 1504, it was abandoned and fell into ruin.

Castle site
The castle was built on a narrow, rocky outcropping below the village of Präz, on the slopes above the valley.  A ditch protects the relatively flat mountain side of the outcropping.  The tower has a pentagon shaped floor plan and today is about three stories tall.  Before its partial collapse in 1956 the tower was a total of six stories high.  It was crowned with battlements and topped with a wooden roof.  A second construction phase added a ring wall around the tower.  The west part of the ring wall is still standing.  The remains of a southern wall show that a several story tall residence probably stood there.

Gallery

See also
 List of castles in Switzerland

References

Castles in Graubünden
Ruined castles in Switzerland